Cheating in sports may refer to:

 Cheating
 Cheating in baseball
 Cheating in bridge
 Cheating in chess
 Cheating in esports
 1994 Formula One cheating controversy
 Cheating at the Paralympic Games
 Doping at the Olympic Games
 Doping at the Tour de France
 Age fraud in association football
 Valve Anti-Cheat
 Doping in tennis
 Fisher and Schwartz cheating scandal
 Fantoni and Nunes cheating scandal
 Cheating in pigeon racing
 McLaren Report
 Mitchell Report
 List of Australian sports controversies
 List of Philippine sports controversies
 Performance enhancing substances
 2019 college admissions bribery scandal
 Boxing at the 2016 Summer Olympics#Judging
 Mechanical doping

See also
 Doping in sport
 Doping at the Olympic Games